Julio César Blanco (born July 4, 1976) is a male professional road cyclist from Venezuela.

Career

1998
1st in General Classification Vuelta al Táchira (VEN)
1999
1st in Stage 10 Vuelta a Venezuela, Cantaura (VEN)

References

External links

1976 births
Living people
Venezuelan male cyclists
Vuelta a Venezuela stage winners
Place of birth missing (living people)
20th-century Venezuelan people